Corunna Station is a pastoral lease that operates as a sheep station in South Australia.

Corunna takes its name from Caroona Hill that was an important point for explorers, as it was one of the few places with surface water between Port Augusta and Uno. The name for the hill and station are taken from a local Aboriginal Australian word for "heron" or "crane".

History 
The lease for Corunna was first taken up in 1861 for pastoral purposes. In 1863 the property was put up for auction. Messrs Scott and Nickolls owned the property in 1867. In 1888 a prospector named William Jones applied for a mining lease south of Corunna, which was granted in 1890.

The French family acquired the property in 1977. In 2005 the family took the Federal Government to the Federal Court of Australia after it tried to acquire the property. The Government wanted to take the property and give it to the Barngarla Aboriginal people as compensation for the land the Government took from them for the Australian Army's Cultana training area. The family spent 100,000 fighting the acquisition and won in 2013. The Government subsequently appealed to the Full Bench of the Federal Court, but then shortly afterwards decided to withdraw the appeal.

The land occupying the extent of the Corunna Station pastoral lease was gazetted by the Government of South Australia as a locality in April 2013 under the name "Corunna Station".

See also
List of ranches and stations

References

Pastoral leases in South Australia
Stations (Australian agriculture)
Eyre Peninsula
Far North (South Australia)